The St. Louis BattleHawks are a professional American football team based in St. Louis, Missouri. The team was founded by Vince McMahon’s Alpha Entertainment and is an owned-and-operated member of the new XFL owned by Dwayne Johnson’s Alpha Acquico. The BattleHawks play their home games at The Dome at America's Center.

History

McMahon Era (2020) 
On December 5, 2018, St. Louis was announced as one of eight cities that would join the newly reformed XFL, as well as  Seattle, Houston, Los Angeles, New York, DC, Tampa Bay, and Dallas. On April 18, 2019, the team hired Jonathan Hayes, who most recently was tight ends coach for the Cincinnati Bengals, as their first head coach. Hayes is an alumnus of the University of Iowa. The team name and logo were revealed on August 21, 2019, as well as the team’s uniforms on December 3, 2019.

On October 15, 2019, The BattleHawks announced their first player in team history, being assigned former Ole Miss Rebels Quarterback Jordan Ta'amu.

The BattleHawks won their first game in team history on February 8, 2020, defeating the Dallas Renegades 15-9. On March 12, 2020, The XFL announced that the remainder of the 2020 XFL season had been cancelled due to the COVID-19 pandemic. The team finished with a 3-2 record. On April 10, 2020, The XFL suspended operations, with all employees, players and staff terminated.

Johnson and Garcia Era (2023–present) 

On August 3, 2020, it was reported that a consortium led by Dwayne "The Rock" Johnson, Dany Garcia, and Gerry Cardinale (through Cardinale's fund RedBird Capital Partners) purchased the XFL for $15 million just hours before an auction could take place; the purchase received court approval on August 7, 2020. The XFL hired Anthony Becht as a Head Coach on April 13, 2022, with the expectation that he would be coaching the St. Louis team. On July 24, 2022, the return of a St. Louis XFL franchise was confirmed, as well as the hiring of Anthony Becht. On October 31, 2022, The XFL officially announced that the BattleHawks name would be returning, with the logo having slight alterations.

Market overview 
During the 2020 season, the BattleHawks were the only XFL team that was founded in a market that lacked a current National Football League franchise. St. Louis hosted NFL football in 1923 with the All-Stars, 1934 with the Gunners, 1960 to 1987 with the Football Cardinals, and again from 1995 to 2015 with the Rams, which moved to Los Angeles in the 2016 season. There is a significant negative sentiment against the NFL in St. Louis, as the owners of the Cardinals and Rams moved to other markets, with the Cardinals saying that the city and county governments of St. Louis declined to provide an adequate new stadium and the Rams saying in a latter that the Dome at America's Center was unacceptable and rejecting the offer of a new stadium in the market in favor of relocating back to Los Angeles. As St. Louis was one of the most recent cities to lose an NFL team, with acceptable facilities by XFL standards, the dome was seen as a good choice.

St. Louis has hosted one alternative professional football team: the Arena Football League's St. Louis Stampede of 1995 and 1996. None of the major alternative outdoor leagues of the late 20th and early 21st centuries had a team there. Some indoor football teams have played at Family Arena in suburban St. Charles, Missouri, including the RiverCity Rage and River City Raiders. Until Lindenwood University (located in St. Charles) joined the Ohio Valley Conference in 2022, St. Louis had also been devoid of NCAA Division I football at both the FBS and FCS levels since 1949, when the Saint Louis University Billikens dropped football as an intercollegiate sport; the nearest FBS football squad, the Missouri Tigers, play in Columbia.

The St. Louis BattleHawks share the Missouri winter sports market with one other major professional team, the National Hockey League's St. Louis Blues, and with the Billikens', Lions' and Tigers' college basketball teams. In the spring the BattleHawks share the pro sports market with Major League Soccer's St Louis City SC and the always well-supported Major League Baseball St Louis Cardinals.

The Dome at America's Center was built for a future National Football League expansion team or relocation and as an addition to the adjoining St. Louis Convention Center. In 1995, the under construction dome lured the Los Angeles Rams to St. Louis. After the Rams left in 2016, the Dome continued to host a plethora of other events, enough that the stadium was unable to host a team in the former Alliance of American Football for the 2019 season. The XFL rented the Dome for $800,000 per season (a $300,000 flat fee plus $100,000 for each game) in exchange for keeping all of the revenue from ticket sales; the St. Louis Convention and Visitors Commission keeps concession and parking revenue. As part of the agreement to return in 2023, the XFL signed a three-year lease on the Dome with similar terms to its 2020 lease. For XFL games, the Dome has a reduced capacity, similar to the San Antonio Brahmas use of the Alamodome and the Orlando Guardians at Camping World Stadium. After two consecutive sellouts of the lower bowl, city officials began planning to open up some sections of the upper decks to accommodate more fans while still maintaining the up-close intimate atmosphere the league seeks. This carried over into the 2023 season, with an estimated 35,000 tickets sold for the team's March 11 home opener and the upper decks of the dome being opened to accommodate the high demand. The game drew an XFL record 38,310 attendance, eclipsing the previous record St. Louis set in 2020 and record of 38,253 set by the San Francisco Demons of the original XFL in 2001.

The BattleHawks lead the league in followers on Twitter, Instagram, and in fan attendance. The St. Louis media market led the nation in television viewership for the opening week, posting a 7.4 Nielsen rating for the BattleHawks' first game. Fans often chanted “Kroenke Sucks” to express distaste for Stan Kroenke, the former owner of the St. Louis Rams, who controversially returned the team to Los Angeles, California following the 2015 NFL season.

Staff

Players

Current roster

Player and staff historyHead Coach history

Offensive Coordinator history

Defensive Coordinator history

Notable former players 
 Taylor Heinicke - current Atlanta Falcons quarterback
 Jordan Ta'amu - current DC Defenders quarterback
 Will Hill - former Baltimore Ravens defensive back
 Matt Jones - former Washington Redskins running back
 Marquette King - former Oakland Raiders punter
 Christine Michael - former Seattle Seahawks running back, 2013 NFL Draft 2nd round pick

Current notable players 

Marcell Ateman - Former Las Vegas Raiders Wide Receiver, 2018 7th Round Pick
A. J. McCarron - Former Alabama Crimson Tide Quarterback, 2014 5th Round Pick

References

External links